Zachary Aston-Reese (born August 10, 1994) is an American professional ice hockey forward with the Toronto Maple Leafs of the National Hockey League (NHL). He previously played with the Pittsburgh Penguins and Anaheim Ducks.

Prior to turning professional, Aston-Reese played for Northeastern University. He was named a Hobey Baker hat trick finalist, Hockey East First-Team All-Star, and won Hockey East Player of the Year.

Playing career

Early career
While playing for the New Jersey Rockets of the Atlantic Junior Hockey League (AJHL) during the 2010–11 season, Aston-Reese also appeared in the United States Hockey League (USHL). He played two games for the Des Moines Buccaneers, as well as 25 games for the Lincoln Stars. Aston-Reese joined the Stars full-time for the 2011–12 season. In 53 games, he recorded 5 goals and 10 assists. After one more season with the Stars, Aston-Reese joined the Division 1 Northeastern Huskies. He played for the club for four seasons. During the 2015–16 season, the Huskies won the Hockey East Tournament championship. The following season, Aston-Reese was named to the Hockey East First All-Star Team, NCAA Division I First All-American Team, and the Hockey East Player of the Year.

Professional

Pittsburgh Penguins
On March 14, 2017, Aston-Reese, as an undrafted player, signed a two-year, entry-level contract with the Pittsburgh Penguins. He joined the Penguins American Hockey League (AHL) affiliate, the Wilkes-Barre/Scranton Penguins for the remainder of the season, recording eight points in ten games.

Aston-Reese started the 2017–18 season in the minors, but made his NHL debut on February 3, 2018 against the New Jersey Devils. He recorded his first two NHL goals in a 6–3 win over the Ottawa Senators on February 13. On February 27, Aston-Reese suffered an upper-body injury during practice. He returned to the Penguins' lineup on March 27 after missing 13 games. Aston-Reese made his postseason debut on April 11, 2018 against the Philadelphia Flyers. On April 18, he recorded his first career playoff point, assisting on a goal by Riley Sheahan. During Game 3 of Round 2 against the Washington Capitals, Aston-Reese was checked by Tom Wilson, resulting in a broken jaw and a concussion. Wilson was suspended three playoff games for the hit.

Prior to the beginning of the 2018–19 season, Aston-Reese was reassigned to Wilkes-Barre/Scranton. However, he was called to the NHL on November 6, after he recorded six goals in 11 games. Aston-Reese managed to score six goals and eleven points in his next 30 games, but he broke his hand in a game against the Florida Panthers on January 8, 2019.

On July 22, 2019, the Penguins re-signed Aston-Reese to a two-year, $2 million contract extension.

As a restricted free agent after the 2020-2021 season, Aston-Reese filed for salary arbitration with the Penguins. The arbitration hearing was scheduled for August 23, 2021. On August 5, 2021, the Penguins re-signed Aston-Reese to a one-year, $1.725 million contract, avoiding the arbitration hearing.

Anaheim Ducks
On March 21, 2022, Aston-Reese was traded by Pittsburgh, along with Dominik Simon, prospect Calle Clang, and a second round draft choice to the Anaheim Ducks in exchange for Rickard Rakell.

Toronto Maple Leafs
Ahead of the 2022–23 NHL season, Aston-Reese joined the Toronto Maple Leafs for a professional tryout. Following a successful pre-season showing, Aston-Reese was signed to a one-year, $840,000 contract with the Maple Leafs on October 9, 2022.  He got his first goal as a Maple Leaf in their 5-2 win against the Philadelphia Flyers on November 2.

Personal life
Aston-Reese was born on August 10, 1994 in the New York City borough of Staten Island. He is the third child of William Sr. and Carolyn (née Buckheit). He has two older siblings: a sister, and a brother named William Jr. He attended PS 45 in West Brighton and Morris Intermediate School in Brighton Heights, New York, then enrolled at St. Peter's Prep in Jersey City, where he played his freshman year 

Aston-Reese was a graphic design major in college and has occasionally worked in the Penguins' front office on the design of gameday programs.

Career statistics

Awards and honors

References

External links
 

1994 births
Living people
AHCA Division I men's ice hockey All-Americans
American men's ice hockey forwards
Anaheim Ducks players
Des Moines Buccaneers players
Ice hockey players from New York (state)
Lincoln Stars players
Northeastern Huskies men's ice hockey players
Pittsburgh Penguins players
Toronto Maple Leafs players
Undrafted National Hockey League players
Wilkes-Barre/Scranton Penguins players